Saint-Moïse is a parish municipality in Quebec, Canada. It is located at the intersection of routes 132 and 297.

Demographics 

Notable residents
Joseph Kaeble - Saint-Moïse born recipient of the Victoria Cross for actions in France during the First World War

See also
 List of parish municipalities in Quebec

References

Parish municipalities in Quebec
Incorporated places in Bas-Saint-Laurent
La Matapédia Regional County Municipality